Manidurai Naveen Raja Jacob (born 10 January 1989), known as Naveen is an integral part of current India men's national volleyball team. He currently plays for Chennai Spartans in Pro Volleyball League.

Early life 
Manidurai Naveen Raja Jacob was born on January 10, 1989, at Sundankottai village, Thoothukudi district, Tamil Nadu. Having noticed by his brother with a talent for volleyball, he started playing from 2003. On 2007, he got national attention when his Vijayawada team won National championship. Because of his national level recognition, he was rewarded with a job in Indian overseas bank in 2007.

Professional life 
Naveen Jacob is integral part of India men's national volleyball team. He wears number 18 jersey and plays in the position of Opposite/setter.
As per his reviews, he said in the interviews that "In 2007 I was selected to the Senior Tamil Nadu team, the same year I was picked in the Indian team for the Youth World Championship in Mexico. Thereon, from 2008 until 2016 I represented the Indian team and from 2007 until this year the Senior Tamil Nadu team. Played in the Asian Games in 2010 and 2014 and Senior Asian Championship in 2009, 2011 and 2013, SAF Games and several other international invitation tournaments". Manidurai Naveen Raja Jacob has also captained Tamil Nadu Volleyball Team.

References

Living people
Indian men's volleyball players
1989 births
Volleyball players at the 2010 Asian Games
Volleyball players at the 2014 Asian Games
Volleyball players from Tamil Nadu
People from Thoothukudi district
Asian Games competitors for India